Ralph Thompson may refer to:

 Ralph Thompson (footballer) (1892–1916), English amateur footballer
 Ralph Thompson (illustrator) (1913–2009), British artist and book illustrator
 Ralph Thompson (poet) (born 1928), Jamaican businessman, educational activist, artist and poet
 Ralph C. Thompson (c. 1947–2014), Canadian judge and lawyer
 Ralph Gordon Thompson (born 1934), United States federal judge
 Sir Ralph Wood Thompson (1830–1902), British civil servant
 Smack Thompson (Ralph Sandford Thompson, 1900–1981), college football player